Nickel(II) hydroxide is the inorganic compound with the formula Ni(OH)2.  It is a lime-green solid that dissolves with decomposition in ammonia and amines and is attacked by acids. It is electroactive, being converted to the Ni(III) oxy-hydroxide, leading to widespread applications in rechargeable batteries.

Properties

Nickel(II) hydroxide has two well-characterized polymorphs, α and β. The α structure consists of Ni(OH)2 layers with intercalated anions or water. The β form adopts a hexagonal close-packed structure of Ni2+ and OH− ions. In the presence of water, the α polymorph typically recrystallizes to the β form. In addition to the α and β polymorphs, several γ nickel hydroxides have been described, distinguished by crystal structures with much larger inter-sheet distances.

The mineral form of Ni(OH)2, theophrastite, was first identified in the Vermion region of northern Greece, in 1980. It is found naturally as a translucent emerald-green crystal formed in thin sheets near the boundaries of idocrase or chlorite crystals. A nickel-magnesium variant of the mineral,  had been previously discovered at Hagdale on the island of Unst in Scotland.

Reactions
Nickel(II) hydroxide is frequently used in electrical car batteries. Specifically, Ni(OH)2 readily oxidizes to nickel oxyhydroxide, NiOOH, in combination with a reduction reaction, often of a metal hydride (reaction 1 and 2).

Reaction 1 

Reaction 2 

Net Reaction (in H2O)

Of the two polymorphs, α-Ni(OH)2 has a higher theoretical capacity and thus is generally considered to be preferable in electrochemical applications. However, it transforms to β-Ni(OH)2 in alkaline solutions, leading to many investigations into the possibility of stabilized α-Ni(OH)2 electrodes for industrial applications.

Synthesis
The synthesis entails treating aqueous solutions of nickel(II) salts with potassium hydroxide.

Toxicity

The Ni2+ ion is a known carcinogen. Toxicity and related safety concerns have driven research into increasing the energy density of Ni(OH)2 electrodes, such as the addition of calcium or cobalt hydroxides.

See also
List of minerals named after people
Nickel-cadmium battery
Nickel hydrogen battery
Nickel metal hydride battery
Nickel-iron battery

References

Nickel compounds
Hydroxides